Alan Harvey (born 11 April 1942) is a former professional soccer player. He played club soccer for Toronto Roma, Toronto Falcons, Rochester Lancers, and Toronto Croatia. Born in England, he represented Canada at international level.

Club career 
Harvey played in the Midland League in 1961 with Gainsborough Trinity. In 1961, he played in the Eastern Canada Professional Soccer League with Toronto City for three seasons. During the off season he continued playing in the Midland League with Denaby United in the 1963–64 season. In 1963, Toronto City traded Harvey to Toronto Roma for Ray Edwards and George Crook. In 1968, he played in the North American Soccer League with Toronto Falcons.

In 1969, he played in the American Soccer League with Rochester Lancers. The following season he served as a player-coach with the Serbian White Eagles in the National Soccer League. For the remainder of the 1970 season he played with Toronto Croatia. He assisted Croatia in securing the Canadian Open Cup by defeating Vancouver Eintracht in 1971. In 1972, he served as a player-coach on an interim basis for Toronto Croatia until the arrival of Gordan Irović.

International career 
Harvey made his debut for the Canada national team on 6 October 1968 against Bermuda in a World Cup qualifier match.

References

1942 births
Living people
Footballers from Barnsley
English emigrants to Canada
Canadian soccer coaches
Canadian soccer players
Canada men's international soccer players
Gainsborough Trinity F.C. players
Toronto City players
Denaby United F.C. players
Toronto Roma players
Toronto Falcons (1967–68) players
Rochester Lancers (1967–1980) players
Serbian White Eagles FC players
Toronto Croatia players
Eastern Canada Professional Soccer League players
North American Soccer League (1968–1984) players
American Soccer League (1933–1983) players
Association football defenders
Association football player-managers
Canadian National Soccer League players
English footballers
Serbian White Eagles FC managers
Toronto Croatia managers
Canadian National Soccer League coaches